It's Your Move is the tenth studio album by American singer Freddie Jackson. It was released through Martland Entertainment Group on February 24, 2004. His first album in five years, it peaked at number 45 on the US Top R&B/Hip-Hop Albums.

Critical reception

Allmusic editor Rob Theakston found that with "the landscape and climate of urban radio" having changed and Jackson having "to adapt, [...] It's Your Move [has] a bit of a hurried, uneven production style throughout. Jackson's voice is still the dominant focus, as smooth and assured as ever, even though it feels at odds with the slick and overly polished production sound. Nevertheless, fans pining for new Jackson material will be pleased in what they hear here, even if it isn't exactly his finest offering."

Track listing

Charts

References

External links
 

2004 albums
Freddie Jackson albums